The Rock Creek Woods Historic District is a national historic district located north of Kensington, Montgomery County, Maryland (although the postal address is Silver Spring).  This suburban development, consisting of 74 Contemporary houses, is nestled in a wooded valley between two creeks near Connecticut Avenue (MD 185). These houses were designed by Charles Goodman and built between 1958 and 1961 by Herschel and Marvin Blumberg, developers of New Town Center in nearby Hyattsville, Maryland.  The original layout, including roads, lot configurations, and sidewalks, remains unaltered. During the 1960s, the neighborhood was home to a significant Jewish population and many people in the neighborhood were active in liberal causes, particularly the peace movement.

It was listed on the National Register of Historic Places in 2004.

References

External links
, including photo in 2003, at Maryland Historical Trust website
Boundary Map of the Rock Creek Woods Historic District, Montgomery County, at Maryland Historical Trust

Historic districts on the National Register of Historic Places in Maryland
Historic districts in Montgomery County, Maryland
Historic Jewish communities in the United States
Houses in Montgomery County, Maryland
National Register of Historic Places in Montgomery County, Maryland
Rock Creek (Potomac River tributary)
1950s architecture in the United States
1960s architecture in the United States
1950s in Maryland
1960s in Maryland
Modernist architecture in Maryland